Lieutenant-General Patrick Oswald Dunn (29 May 1911–16 September 1977) was an Indian Army general. He commanded the I Coprs during the Indo-Pak War of 1965 for which he was awarded the third-highest award of India - the Padma Bhushan.

Career
Dunn took a law degree from Cambridge University. He was commissioned in the British Indian Army on 15 July 1938. As was customary, on 10 August 1938 he was attached to a battalion of a regular British Army regiment, the 2nd Worcestershire Regiment, for a period of one year prior to his official appointment to the Indian Army. Joining the 10th Baluch Regiment, Dunn attended Staff College, Camberley in 1945, and commanded a Gorkha battalion from November 1946. As 10 Baluch was allocated to the Pakistan Army following Indian independence and Partition, he transferred to the 3rd Gorkha Rifles, and became officiating commander of an infantry brigade in January 1949.

On 20 August 1955, Dunn, now an acting colonel, was given command of an infantry brigade. He was appointed Commandant of the Infantry School on 16 September 1959.

General officer
In September 1961, he was promoted to the acting rank of major general and appointed Chief of Staff, Southern Command. On 17 December 1962, he was given command of an infantry division. In January 1964, he was appointed Deputy Chief of General Staff (DCGS), serving for one year until the post was abolished on 15 January 1965. He was then appointed Director of Staff Duties (DSD) from that date until April 1965, when he commanded troops in the Rann of Kutch following Pakistan's Operation Desert Hawk.

At the end of May, Dunn was appointed GOC of the newly raised I Corps, which he commanded during the conflict between India and Pakistan that August. He was awarded the Padma Bhushan for his service, and voluntarily retired from the Army on 19 May 1967, after nearly 29 years of service.

Dates of rank

Notes

References

1911 births
1977 deaths
British Indian Army officers
Indian Army personnel of World War II
People of the Indo-Pakistani War of 1965
Indian generals
Indian Army personnel
Recipients of the Padma Bhushan in civil service